The Glorious First of June (known in France as Bataille du 13 prairial an 2 and sometimes called the Third Battle of Ushant) of 1794 was the first and largest naval action between the French and British fleets during the French Revolutionary Wars. The British fleet under Lord Howe was attempting to defeat a French fleet under Villaret de Joyeuse which was in turn attempting to lure Howe away from a grain convoy destined for France from the United States. The future of the French Revolution depended on this 117-strong convoy which would save France from famine if it arrived safely. Ultimately, both admirals were successful in their ambitions; Howe defeated Villaret in open battle and sunk or captured seven of his ships. Villaret managed to occupy Howe for long enough and inflict sufficient damage that the convoy escaped unscathed.

Although the campaign was decided by a final major action, May 1794 saw both fleets at sea with several subordinate squadrons, both admirals conducting a complicated series of convoy, commerce raiding and fleet manoeuvre operations. Numerous merchant ships and small warships were taken or destroyed during the month-long campaign by both sides, and there were also two partial fleet engagements as Howe and Villaret made first contact. Both admirals suffered from wilful disobedience by a number of their officers during the battle, as well as confusion in reading signals which caused an uneven series of melees to break out rather than the unified battleline Howe had envisaged when planning the action. Nevertheless, both commanders were highly praised on their return to their home ports and the battle was considered a success by both sides, with only a few dissenters amongst the naval establishments of both nations.

Historians have had great trouble determining the exact dispositions of the French fleet and even more trouble assessing the casualties it suffered in the battle. During The Terror then raging in France, bureaucracy broke down and consequently records were patchy or non-existent. The French Navy was no exception and few ship's logs have survived, making an accurate order of battle difficult to discern. Those estimates which are available are often the work of British naval officers at the battle whose accounts frequently differ. Casualties too are almost impossible to establish exactly. French sources published after the battle give a figure of 3,000, but this number does not include those captured, which amounted to 3,500 alone. British estimates aboard captured ships alone are of 1,500 casualties and most historians agree that total French losses during the month-long campaign were around 7,000, as opposed to the British losses estimated at between 1,100 and 1,500.

British fleet

28 May

29 May

1 June

Attached squadrons

French fleet

28 May

29 May

1 June

Attached squadrons

The various French units patrolling in the Bay of Biscay kept in contact through a large number of frigates and smaller craft which passed messages between the commanders. This close contact enabled the French fleets to successfully divert the British away from the convoy. Due to the turbulent situation existing in France during 1794, accurate records regarding which frigates were with which fleet and which were present at which action do not exist. Thus only an incomplete listing of French support craft can be created, based mainly on those recognised and reported by British officers.

See also

Notes, citations and references

Notes

Citations

References 
 
 
 
 
 
 
 
 
 
 

Glorious First of June
French Revolutionary Wars orders of battle